Elizabeth Lee may refer to:

Elizabeth Blair Lee (1818–1906), wrote letters in the American Civil War to husband Samuel Philips Lee
Elizabeth Harriet Lee, maiden name of Elizabeth Leigh Murray (1815–1892), English actress
Elizabeth Lee (actress) (born 1963), Hongkongese TV and film actress
Elizabeth Lee (writer) (1857/8–1920), biographer and translator
Elizabeth Lee Hazen (1885–1975), co-discoverer of nystatin
Elizabeth Lee (politician), Australian politician and Leader of the Opposition in the Australian Capital Territory
Betty Lambert (Elizabeth Minnie Lee, 1933–1983), Canadian writer
Liz Lee, the main character in the TV series My Life as Liz
Liz Lee (politician), member of the Minnesota House of Representatives

See also
Elizabeth Medora Leigh (1814–1849), rumoured to be Lord Byron's daughter
Liz Lee